Vanderlip is a surname. Notable people with the surname include:

Dolly Vanderlip (born 1937), American baseball player
Narcissa Cox Vanderlip, American suffragist
Frank A. Vanderlip (1864–1937), American banker and journalist

See also
Vanderlip, West Virginia, unincorporated community in the United States